Kathy Skippen is an American politician and farmer from Idaho. Skippen was a Republican member of Idaho House of Representatives.

Career 
Skippen and her family are in the agriculture industry in Idaho. Skippen is a farmer.

Skippen was a county commissioner for Gem County, Idaho.

Elections

2006 
Skippen was defeated in the Republican primary by Steven Thayn taking only 47.7% of the vote.

2004 
Skippen defeated Terry A. Jones and Dale R. Salyers in the Republican primary taking 50.7% of the vote. Skippen defeated Constitution party nominee Marvin Richardson with 77.9% of the vote in the general election.

2002 
Skippen defeated Jonna Weber, Terry A. Jones, and Louis E. "Ed" Falkenstien in the Republican primary taking 28.2% of the vote. Skippen was unopposed in the general election.

Personal life 
Skippen lives in Emmett, Idaho.

References

External links 
 Kathy Skippen at ourcampaigns.com
 Kathy Skippen at apps.itd.idaho.gov (February 6, 2005)
 Kathy Skippen at spokesman.com (October 24, 2004)
 Kathy Skippen at argusobserver.com (September 23, 2005)
 Kathy Skippen at baltimorrsun.com (September 5, 2004)

Living people
Year of birth missing (living people)
Place of birth missing (living people)
21st-century American politicians
21st-century American women politicians
Republican Party members of the Idaho House of Representatives
Women state legislators in Idaho
People from Emmett, Idaho
County commissioners in Idaho